Ilchino (İlse) is a rural locality (a selo) and the administrative centre of Ilchinsky Selsoviet, Uchalinsky District, Bashkortostan, Russia. The population was 1,143 as of 2010. There are 25 streets.

Geography 
Ilchino is located 18 km northeast of Uchaly (the district's administrative centre) by road. Safarovo is the nearest rural locality.

References 

Rural localities in Uchalinsky District